Ernesto Montemayor "Sonny" Ganaden is an American attorney and politician who has served as a member of the Hawaii House of Representatives' 30th district in 2020.

Background and education 
Ernesto Montemayor Ganaden is a second generation Filipino American. Ganaden received his degree in Political Science and Public Policy from the University of California, Los Angeles (UCLA). In 2006, he received his Juris Doctor degree from the University of Hawaiʻi at Mānoa's William S. Richardson School of Law.

Legal and academic career 
As an attorney, Ganaden defended the rights of Native Hawaiian elders who were arrested for protesting the construction of the controversial Thirty Meter Telescope. In 2013, Ganaden was the leader writer on the Native Hawaiian Justice Task Force Report, which concluded that Native Hawaiians were disproportionately and unfairly overrepresented in Hawaiian prisons. Ganaden has criticized the existence of private prisons and argued that in "communities where basic human needs are met, crime is rare".

Ganaden was previously an instructor at the University of Hawai'i at Mānoa, teaching in the departments of American studies and ethnic studies. Ganaden contributed an essay to Detours: A Decolonial Guide to Hawai’i, where he wrote about King Kamehameha I's impact on modern Hawaiian law.

Hawaii House of Representatives

Elections 
In 2018, Ganaden ran to represent District 30 in of the Hawaii House of Representatives, where he faced incumbent Romeo Munoz Cachola in the Democratic primary. Cachola narrowly defeated Ganaden by a 51-vote margin.

In 2020, Ganaden ran for the seat once again, defeating incumbent Cachola in the Democratic primary and defeating Republican Tess Quillingking in the general election. During the 2020 campaign, Ganaden spoke out against proposed austerity measures during the COVID-19 pandemic.

Tenure 
In office, Ganaden has called for the United States Navy to be investigated for potentially misleading regulators about a fuel release into Pearl Harbor, which is part of Ganaden's district. Ganaden is a member of the Progressive Legislative Caucus, a coalition of left-wing members of the Hawaii Legislature.

References

Asian-American people in Hawaii politics
Living people
Democratic Party members of the Hawaii House of Representatives
21st-century American politicians
Year of birth missing (living people)
Hawaii politicians of Filipino descent
Filipino-American culture in Hawaii
American politicians of Filipino descent
William S. Richardson School of Law alumni
University of California, Los Angeles alumni